"Brianstorm" (often mistaken as "Brainstorm") is a song by the English rock band Arctic Monkeys. It is the opening track on their second album, Favourite Worst Nightmare. 
The song was released as the first single from the album on 2 April 2007, debuting at number 21 in the UK Singles Chart via downloads alone. The single was released in physical formats on 16 April, the week before the release of the album, and charted at number two on the UK Singles Chart behind Beyoncé and Shakira's "Beautiful Liar". In Scotland, the song became the band's fourth consecutive number-one single on the Scottish Singles Chart. "Brianstorm" is one of the band's most successful singles worldwide, reaching number four in Denmark, number seven in Ireland, and number 10 in Spain.

The song was noticeably louder and heavier than previous efforts, marking the band's evolved sound. The song prominently features 'thundering drums' and surf-rock tremolo guitars. The song is also well known for its intricate and rapid drum track, which was voted the tenth best drum track of the millennium on MusicRadar.

"Brianstorm" came in at number 62 on MTV Asia's list of Top 100 Hits of 2007. It was also used on The Colbert Report, The Daily Show and Late Night with Conan O'Brien during the final weeks of the 07–08 Writers Guild strike, in which it is played during a showdown between the three.

Background and recording
Prior to the single, there had been a great deal of media speculation questioning the band's ability to emulate their successes of 2006 and their debut album. The single marks a noticeable change in band's logo and cover art, with the "frenetic" cover art seeming to mirror the nature of the track. The track has no chorus, but features an "ascending guitar duel which sounds like a cross between "Telstar", Mogwai and the Monkeys' own "When the Sun Goes Down"." A feature of Arctic Monkeys songs in the past, Alex Turner's Sheffield-accent is again a feature, "singing over rough, relentless bass and surprisingly appropriate guitar triplets."

When asked to say a little about the song's protagonist, Alex Turner replied, "I can't remember Brian now... I don't know if he were in my imagination or what... it's a blank spot in my brain... I think that's what he [Brian] wanted." He later explained in NME that Brian had been a guy that they had met backstage in the band's dressing room at a gig at Studio Coast "Ageha" in Tokyo, Japan, and that "When he left the room, we were a bit in awe of his presence. So we did a brainstorm for what he was like, drew a little picture and wrote things about him," while guitarist Jamie Cook added "He was right smooth, very LA. He just appeared with like a business card and like a round neck T-shirt and a tie loosely around it, I'd never seen that before. It felt like he was trying to get inside your mind. We were checking out his attire; it inspired us."

Music video
The music video for the song, directed by Huse Monfaradi, features the band playing in a sparse sepia set, interspersed with clips of female dancers in front of a large computerised display, stock footage from old medical educational programs and brief flashes of images of objects mentioned in the lyrics, such as "Brian", "jacuzzi" and lightning in place of "thunder". The video was recorded on 14 February 2007, the same day as the 2007 Brit Awards, leading to them missing the ceremony and instead sending two video acceptance messages where they dressed as The Wizard of Oz characters and the Village People. The video premiered on MTV2 on 17 March 2007.

Track listings

Personnel

Arctic Monkeys
 Alex Turner – lead and backing vocals, rhythm guitar
 Jamie Cook – lead guitar, backing vocals
 Nick O'Malley – bass guitar, backing vocals
 Matt Helders – drums, percussion, backing vocals

Technical
 Alan Moulder – mixing
 George Marino – mastering

Charts and certifications

Weekly charts

Year-end charts

Certifications

In popular culture
The track is featured in the rhythm video game Guitar Hero 5, and it is considered to be one of the hardest tracks on drums due to its sporadic tom-tom beats.

References

External links
 Official Arctic Monkeys website
  
 Song of the day on thishereboogie.com
 

2007 singles
2007 songs
Arctic Monkeys songs
Canadian Singles Chart number-one singles
Domino Recording Company singles
Number-one singles in Scotland
Song recordings produced by James Ford (musician)
Songs written by Alex Turner (musician)